F-sharp minor is a minor scale based on F, consisting of the pitches F, G, A, B, C, D, and E. Its key signature has three sharps. Its relative major is A major and its parallel major is F-sharp major (or enharmonically G-flat major).

The F-sharp natural minor scale is:

Changes needed for the melodic and harmonic versions of the scale are written in with accidentals as necessary. The F-sharp harmonic minor and melodic minor scales are:

Music in F-sharp minor 
Very few symphonies are written in this key, Haydn's Farewell Symphony being one famous example. George Frederick Bristow and Dora Pejačević also wrote symphonies in this key.

The few concerti written in this key are usually written for the composer himself to play, including Rachmaninoff's Piano Concerto No. 1, Scriabin's Piano Concerto, Wieniawski's Violin Concerto No. 1, Vieuxtemps's Violin Concerto No. 2, and Koussevitzky's Double Bass Concerto.

In addition to the Farewell Symphony, Haydn's Piano Trio No. 40 (Hob. XV:26) and String Quartet Op. 50, No. 4 are in F-sharp minor. 

More prominent piano pieces written in F-sharp minor include Schumann's Sonata No. 1 in F-sharp minor (1833-35), Chopin's Polonaise in F minor, Scriabin's Third Sonata, and Ravel's Sonatine. The slow movement of Beethoven's Hammerklavier piano sonata is written in this key.

Handel set the sixth of his eight harpsichord suites of 1720 in F-sharp minor. Aside from a prelude and fugue from each of the two books of The Well-Tempered Clavier, Bach's only other work in F-sharp minor is the Toccata BWV 910. Mozart's only composition in this key is the second movement to his Piano Concerto No. 23 in A major.

Notable classical compositions in F-sharp minor 

Charles-Valentin Alkan: Concerto for Solo Piano: Allegretto alla barbaresca
Johannes Brahms
Piano Sonata No. 2, Op. 2
Hungarian Dance No. 5 (original piano version)
Frédéric Chopin
Polonaise in F-sharp minor, Op. 44
Nocturne, Op. 48, No. 2
Mazurka, Op. 59, No. 3
Prelude No. 8 in F# minor, Op. 28/8
 Ernst von Dohnányi: Suite in F-sharp minor
George Enescu: Piano Sonata No. 1, Op. 24, No. 1 (1924)
Gabriel Fauré: Pavane, Op. 50
César Franck
Symphonic Variations
Les Djinns
Joseph Haydn
Symphony No. 45 (Farewell)
  Piano Trio No. 40, Hob. XV:26
Sergei Rachmaninoff
Piano Concerto No. 1, Op. 1
Prelude in F-sharp minor No. 1, Op. 23
Maurice Ravel: Sonatine
Franz Schubert: Piano Sonata in F-sharp minor, D 571 (incomplete)
Robert Schumann: Piano Sonata No. 1, Op. 11
Alexander Scriabin
Piano Concerto, Op. 20
 Piano Sonata No. 3, Op. 23
Dmitri Shostakovich
Prelude and Fugue No. 8, Op. 87
String Quartet No. 7, Op. 108
Igor Stravinsky: Piano Sonata (1903–04)
Georg Philipp Telemann: Fantasy for Solo Flute No. 10
Henryk Wieniawski: Violin Concerto No. 1, Op. 14

References

Further reading
 Anthony Morris, "Symphonies, Numbers and Keys" in Bob's Poetry Magazine, III.3, March 2006.

External links

Musical keys
Minor scales